Paramakatoi Airport  is an airport serving the village of Paramakatoi, in the Potaro-Siparuni Region of Guyana.

As of 2020, Trans Guyana Airways offers weekly flights from Eugene F. Correira International Airport to Paramakatoi.

See also

 List of airports in Guyana
 Transport in Guyana

References

External links
OurAirports - Paramakatoi Airport

Airports in Guyana